Pebbles, Volume 10 may refer to:

 Pebbles, Volume 10 (1980 album)
 Pebbles, Volume 10 (1996 album)